Mosharraf Hossain is a Bangladesh Nationalist Party politician and a former Jatiya Sangsad member representing the Bogra-4 constituency during 2019–2022. He resigned from the position on 11 December 2022.

Career
Hossain was elected to parliament from Bogra-4 as a Bangladesh Nationalist Party candidate on 30 December 2018.

References

External links
mosharrfhossainmp.com (archived)

Awami League politicians
Living people
11th Jatiya Sangsad members
Year of birth missing (living people)
Bangladesh Nationalist Party politicians